Avienus may refer to:

Gennadius Avienus (fl. 450–460s), Roman politician
Avienus (consul 501), Roman politician
Rufius Magnus Faustus Avienus (consul 502), Roman politician

See also
 Aviena gens, ancient Roman family
Avianus, also spelled Avienus
Avienius, commonly (mis)spelled Avienus